Margaret Moers Wenig (born 1957) is an American rabbi known for advocating LGBT rights within Reform Judaism. Margaret became spiritually aware at an early age. A seminal moment in her development occurred when she was in sixth grade and had a birthday party, to which she invited all her classmates except one boy, who was devastated as a result. She realized the degree to which she had hurt the boy, and this set her on a path of soul searching and religious awareness.

In 1976, she and Naomi Janowitz published Siddur Nashim, which was the first Jewish prayer book to refer to God using female pronouns and imagery.

She graduated from Brown University in 1978, and was ordained in 1984.

In 1990, she wrote the sermon “God is a Woman and She is Growing Older”, which has been widely published.

In 1995, Wenig, Sharon Kleinbaum, and Russell Pearce sent a resolution asking for support for civil marriage for gay couples to the Reform movement's Commission on Social Action; when it was approved by them, Wenig submitted it to the Central Conference of American Rabbis, which approved it in 1996.

Wenig married Sharon Kleinbaum in 2008; they later divorced.

In 2015, Wenig became the first Jewish president of the Academy of Homiletics.

Wenig now teaches liturgy and homiletics at the Hebrew Union College-Jewish Institute of Religion.

References

1957 births
21st-century American rabbis
20th-century American rabbis
American Reform rabbis
Brown University alumni
Reform Jewish feminists
Lesbian feminists
LGBT rabbis
Living people
Reform women rabbis